A mycotroph is a plant that gets all or part of its carbon, water, or nutrient supply through symbiotic association with fungi. The term can refer to plants that engage in either of two distinct symbioses with fungi:

Many mycotrophs have a mutualistic association with fungi in any of several forms of mycorrhiza. The majority of plant species are mycotrophic in this sense. Examples include Burmanniaceae.
Some mycotrophs are parasitic upon fungi in an association known as myco-heterotrophy.

References 

Trophic ecology
Mycology
Symbiosis
Parasites of fungi
Parasitic plants
Plant nutrition